At the 1976 Central African Games, the athletics events were held at the Stade Omar Bongo in Libreville, Gabon from 30 June – 10 July.

A total of 31 track and field events were contested (19 for men and 12 for women). There were no long-distance running or hurdles races for women and triple jump was a men-only event. Cameroon comfortably topped the medal table with 28 medals and 13 gold medals. Republic of the Congo was a clear second, with six gold medals among a haul of 27. Chad and the host nation Gabon were the only other nations to reach double digits in the medal tally and win multiple gold medals. A total of seven of the eleven competing nations reached the medal table.

Three athletes won multiple individual titles. On the men's side, Denis Dakréo of Cameroon won both the 110 m and 400 m hurdles events, while on the women's side Gabon's Eulalie Mbourou scored a middle-distance double and Cameroon's Germaine Wonja won the shot put and discus throw events. Congolese Théophile Nkounkou and Chadian Boulot Alladoum won the individual and relay events over men's 100 metres and 400 metres, respectively.

Both Dakréo's hurdles times went unbeaten over the history of the games. Among the other unbeaten men's games records established at the competition, Paul Ngadjadoum set 2.13 m in the high jump, Oumarou Poro managed 14.89 m in the shot put, Jean-Emmanuel Vanlier threw 49.04 m in the discus, and the Congolese 4 × 100 metres relay team won in a record 40.3 seconds. Rhoda Idowu's winning long jump of 5.60 m was the only women's performance that stood as an all-time games record.

Medal summary

Men

Women

Medal table

References

Results
Central African Games. GBR Athletics. Retrieved on 2011-03-13.

1976
Central African Games
1976
1976 Central African Games